Gregory Leon Bell (born August 1, 1962) is an American former professional football player who was a running back in the National Football League (NFL) for the Buffalo Bills, Los Angeles Rams and Los Angeles Raiders, from 1984 to 1990.

Bell played college football at the University of Notre Dame and was drafted by the Bills in the first round of the 1984 NFL Draft. Before going to Notre Dame, he attended South High School in Columbus, Ohio.

College Statistics
1980: 5 carries for 66 yards and one touchdown.
1981: 92 carries for 512 yards and 6 touchdowns. 11 catches for 135 yards. 13 kick returns for 371 yards and 1 touchdown.
1982: 24 carries for 123 yards and 1 touchdown. 3 catches for 20 yards. 3 kick returns for 50 yards. 1 punt return for 12 yards.
1983: 37 carries for 169 yards and 4 touchdowns. 6 catches for 65 yards and 1 touchdown. 5 kick returns for 108 yards. 10 punt returns for 55 yards.

Professional career
He was a one-time Pro Bowler after his rookie year in 1984 with the Bills after having a 1,100 rushing yards and a seven touchdown season. Bell had his best year after the 1988 NFL season with the Rams, in which he had 1,212 rushing yards and led the league with sixteen touchdowns. He had a similar season the year after in which Bell had 1137 rushing yards and fifteen touchdowns, again leading the league. To that point, no other running back had ever led the league in rushing touchdowns in consecutive seasons without entering the Pro Football Hall of Fame, and Bell attempted to hold out for a better contract. The Rams instead traded him to the Raiders, who had a loaded backfield consisting of Marcus Allen, Bo Jackson, and Napoleon McCallum; Bell barely saw the field and was out of the NFL after that season.

NFL career statistics

References

1962 births
Living people
Players of American football from Columbus, Ohio
American football running backs
Notre Dame Fighting Irish football players
Buffalo Bills players
Los Angeles Rams players
Los Angeles Raiders players
American Conference Pro Bowl players
Notre Dame Fighting Irish men's track and field athletes